Ľudovít Lancz (2 June 1964 – 20 July 2004) was a football player who played for the Czechoslovakia national football team. His position was both midfielder and forward. In eight seasons in the Czechoslovak First League, Lancz made 153 appearances and scored a total of 24 goals. He played for ŠK Slovan Bratislava in the 1991–92 Czechoslovak First League, with the club winning the league title that season.

Having left a suicide note, he died at the age of 40, after falling from his 11th-floor apartment in Bratislava on 20 July 2004.

References

External links
 
 

1964 births
2004 deaths
2004 suicides
Czechoslovak footballers
Czechoslovakia international footballers
FC Petržalka players
Dukla Prague footballers
FK Dukla Banská Bystrica players
FK Inter Bratislava players
ŠK Slovan Bratislava players
Angers SCO players
Expatriate footballers in France
Association football midfielders
Association football forwards
Suicides by jumping in Slovakia